Adele Palmer (October 21, 1915 – July 1, 2008) was an American costume designer who worked on more than 300 films during her long career. She was nominated for one Oscar. This was for the film The Best of Everything, in the category of Best Costumes-Color during the 32nd Academy Awards.

References

External links
 
 

1915 births
2008 deaths
American costume designers
People from Santa Ana, California